Indonesia has participated in five AFC Asian Cup in their football history. Their first ever appearance was in 1996. Since then, Indonesia had repeatedly qualified for 2000, 2004, and 2007 tournaments, the latter was the first time Indonesia hosted it. Even though having a rich record, Indonesia has never progressed beyond group stage. They qualified for the fifth time in 2023.

Record at the AFC Asian Cup

Record by opponent

Squads

1996 tournament

Group A

2000 tournament

Group B

2004 tournament

Group A

2007 tournament

Group D

Goalscorers

References

Countries at the AFC Asian Cup
Indonesia national football team